Zhang Xuejie (born August 1961) is a lieutenant general (zhongjiang) of the People's Liberation Army (PLA) serving as political commissar of the Tibet Military District, succeeding Wang Jianwu in May 2018.

Biography
Zhang was born in Shou County, Anhui, in August 1961. He served in the 31st Group Army for a long time. In 2013, he was made political commissar of the 12th Group Army, replacing Bai Lü. In 2017, he given the position of political commissar of the 31st Group Army. In 2017, he became deputy director of Political Work Department of the Eastern Theater Command. In May 2018, he succeeded Wang Jianwu as political commissar of the Tibet Military District. In January 2020, he was admitted as a member of the standing committee of the CPC Tibet Regional Committee, the region's top authority.

He was promoted to the rank of major general (Shaojiang) in July 2010 and lieutenant general (zhongjiang) in June 2019.

Personal life 
His elder brother  (born 1955) is a politician and the current vice chairman of the Anhui Provincial Committee of the Chinese People's Political Consultative Conference.

References

1961 births
Living people
People from Shou County
People's Liberation Army generals from Anhui
People's Republic of China politicians from Anhui
Chinese Communist Party politicians from Anhui